Harry Joe Brown (September 22, 1890 – April 28, 1972) was an American film producer, and earlier a theatre and film director.

Biography

Harry Joe Brown was born in 1890 in Pittsburgh, Pennsylvania. As a producer, he had a partnership with director Budd Boetticher, actor Randolph Scott and screenwriter Burt Kennedy, which generated a series of five westerns between 1957 and 1960 (The Tall T, Decision at Sundown, Buchanan Rides Alone, Ride Lonesome, Comanche Station) via a company he created with Scott which eventually became known as Ranown Pictures Corp. He produced the American debut films of both Errol Flynn in Captain Blood and Sean Flynn in Son of Captain Blood.

Brown earlier directed a number of films, among them Knickerbocker Holiday, Sitting Pretty and Madison Square Garden.

Personal life
He was married to actress Sally Eilers. They resided in a mansion located at 625 Mountain Drive, Beverly Hills, California.

Brown died of a heart attack on April 28, 1972, aged 81, in Palm Springs, California.

Selected filmography
 North of Nevada (1924)
 Galloping Gallagher (1924)
 The Mask of Lopez (1924)
 The Silent Stranger (1924)
 The Dangerous Coward (1924)
 The Fighting Sap (1924)
Bashful Buccaneer (1925)
 The Fear Fighter (1925)
 Youth's Gamble (1925)
Fighting Fate  (1925)
 Goat Getter (1925)
 The Patent Leather Pug (1925)
 Rapid Fire Romance (1926)
Moran of the Mounted (1926)
 The High Flyer (1926)
 Racing Romance (1926)
 The Night Owl (1926)
 Kentucky Handicap (1926)
 The Winner (1926)
 Broadway Billy (1926)
 Stick to Your Story (1926)
 The Self Starter (1926)
 One Punch O'Day (1926)
 The Dangerous Dude (1926)
 Gun Gospel (1927)
The Scorcher  (1927)   
 The Royal American (1927)
 The Racing Fool (1927)
 The Lost Limited (1927)
 Romantic Rogue (1927)
 The Wagon Show (1928)
The Glorious Trail (1928)
 The Code of the Scarlet (1928)
The Squealer  (1930)

References

External links
 
 Harry Joe Brown filmography, tcmdb.com; accessed February 5, 2016

1890 births
1972 deaths
Businesspeople from Pittsburgh
Film producers from Pennsylvania
American film directors
20th-century American businesspeople